A chrononaut is a time traveller, one who travels through time.

Chrononaut or chrononauts may also refer to:
 Chrononauts, a card game based on time travelling
 the player class in the alternate reality game SFZero
 the time travellers from Seven Days (TV series)

See also
 Time travel (disambiguation)
 Time Traveler (disambiguation)
 Time Machine (disambiguation)